Ninetowns Internet Technology Group Company Limited was set up in 1995 and now is based in Beijing, China, providing enterprise online software. The company was formerly known as Ninetowns Digital World Trade Holdings Limited until September 2006. There are four segments in the company: 
Enterprise Software and Related Maintenance Services
Software Development Services
Business to Consumer e-commerce
Real Estate Development

History 
Ninetowns was established in 1995 and became public on NASDAQ in December 2004, providing online solutions for international trade, such as business-to-government and business to consumer services. The company's business to consumer service was provided in April 2010, engages in the purchase of organic, fresh and natural food products for delivery to customers' homes. In 2011, the company introduced its Smarter City Real Estate development initiative.

Operations 
In April 2007 the company completed its acquisition of Ample Spring Holdings Limited.

In April 2011 Ninetowns won the right to acquire land use rights about 141,000 square meters in Anhui Province, China. The company named this project “Smarter Town” for commercial and residential use. In the same year, the company’s subsidiary Dalian Aviation Changzheng Technology Development Co., Ltd. won the right to acquire land rights about 20,973 square meters in Dalian, Liaoning Province, China for its real estate market strategy.

Products and services 
Products of the enterprise software and related maintenance services include  series,  and  series, enabling the declaration being processed electronically over the Internet. It also provides software to process electronic filings, and the data exchange. The business to consumer e-commerce provides platform of online food and grocery markets through its web portal.  In addition, the company also enters into real estate market by its real estate development segment. As of December 31, 2012, the company has four real estate development projects.

References 

Companies established in 1995
2004 initial public offerings
2014 mergers and acquisitions